Wilwerwiltz is a village in the commune of Kiischpelt, in northern Luxembourg.  , the village has a population of 238.

Wilwerwiltz was a commune in the canton of Wiltz until 1 January 2006, when it was merged with the commune of Kautenbach to form the new commune of Kiischpelt.  The law creating Kiischpelt was passed on 14 July 2005.

Former commune
The former commune consisted of the villages:

 Enscherange
 Lellingen
 Pintsch
 Wilwerwiltz

Footnotes

Kiischpelt
Former communes of Luxembourg
Villages in Luxembourg